Lt. Colonel Douglas McGlashan Kelley (11 August 1912 – January 1, 1958) was a United States Army Military Intelligence Corps officer who served as chief psychiatrist at Nuremberg Prison during the Nuremberg War Trials. He worked to ascertain defendants' competency before they stood trial.

Life and career

Kelley  was born in Truckee, California. He graduated from University of California at Berkeley and received his medical degree from the School of Medicine in San Francisco. He continued his studies at Columbia University College of Physicians and Surgeons, earning a Doctor of Medical Science in 1941.

In 1942 he was called to duty in the United States Army Medical Corps as chief psychiatrist for the 30th General Hospital in the European Theatre. Along with psychologist Gustave Gilbert he administered the Rorschach inkblot test to the 22 defendants in the Nazi leadership group prior to the first Nuremberg trials. Kelley authored two books on the subject: Twenty-two Cells in Nuremberg and The Case of Rudolph Hess. After his examination of Hess, Kelley concluded that this defendant suffered from "a true psychoneurosis, primarily of the hysterical type, engrafted on a basic paranoid and schizoid personality, with amnesia, partly genuine and partly feigned". His diagnosis was confirmed by at least six other psychiatrists from Russia, France, England and the United States.

Upon honorable discharge in 1946, Kelley was appointed Associate Professor of Psychiatry at the Bowman Gray School of Medicine in North Carolina. In 1949 he was appointed Professor of Criminology at the University of California at Berkeley.  He served as the President of the then Berkeley-based Society for the Advancement of Criminology (later, the American Society of Criminology) in 1950 and 1951.

Kelley was portrayed by Stuart Bunce in the 2006 BBC docudrama Nuremberg: Nazis on Trial, which depicts the events at Nuremberg, as does Jack El-Hai's nonfiction book The Nazi And The Psychiatrist.

Death

Kelley committed suicide in front of his wife, father and oldest son on New Year's Day 1958 during a family gathering to watch the Rose Bowl game on television. He died by ingesting potassium cyanide as had Nazi leader Hermann Göring, whom Kelley had come to know during his psychiatric evaluation at Nuremberg. According to Psychology Today, Kelley was alcoholic and despondent by that time and had a "history of dark moods"; he had also expressed admiration "for Göring’s control over his own death". Neither his son nor wife could shed light on the motivation for the suicide. In an interview, son Doug Kelley recounted the circumstances: "He was cooking dinner, burned himself and exploded. The next thing we knew, he was on the stairs saying he was going to swallow the potassium cyanide and that he'd be dead in 30 seconds". He did as threatened and died in the bathroom, leaving no suicide note.

Publications
 22 Cells in Nuremberg. A Psychiatrist Examines the Nazi Criminals. London: W. H. Allen, 1947.
 Bruno Klopfer: The Rorschach Technique. A Manual for a Projective Method of Personality Diagnosis. With Clinical Contributions by Douglas McGlashan Kelley; introduction by Nolan D. C. Lewis. Yonkers-on-Hudson: World Book Comp. 1942.

Further reading 
 Jack El-Hai : The Nazi and the Psychiatrist, Publisher: PublicAffairs, 2013,

References

External links
Guide to the Douglas McGlashan Kelley Papers via Online Archive of California
Douglas McGlashan Kelley, Criminology: Berkeley via University of California

1912 births
1958 deaths
American psychiatrists
United States Army Medical Corps officers
Nuremberg trials
United States Army personnel of World War II
Suicides by cyanide poisoning
20th-century American physicians
1958 suicides
Suicides in California